The  or METI, is a  ministry of the Government of Japan. It was created by the 2001 Central Government Reform when the Ministry of International Trade and Industry (MITI) merged with agencies from other ministries related to economic activities, such as the Economic Planning Agency.

METI has jurisdiction over a broad policy area, containing Japan's industrial/trade policies, energy security, control of arms exports, "Cool Japan", etc.

The Ministry has its headquarters in Kasumigaseki, Chiyoda Ward, Tokyo. Its current head is Yasutoshi Nishimura, who was appointed minister by Prime Minister Fumio Kishida in August 2022.

Overview 
The mission stipulated in Article 3 of the Act for the Establishment of the Ministry of Economy, Trade and Industry (Act No. 99 of 1999) is to "enhance the economic vitality of the private sector and develop economic and industrial development centered on the smooth development of foreign economic relations, as well as the stable and efficient development of mineral and energy resources." In order to achieve the goal of ensuring supply, it has jurisdiction over macroeconomic policies, industrial policies, trade policies, trade control operations, industrial technology policies, distribution policies, and energy policies.

Some middle-ranking bureaucrats selected from the Ministry of Economy, Trade and Industry are based in the Japan External Trade Organization in foreign countries and are engaged in various research work as industrial investigators.

Since many of the industrial policies initiated by METI, such as the nuclear fuel cycle program and the 5th generation computer program and software development program ("Sigma Plan"), have failed, the ministry is not exactly highly regarded and trusted in Japan in the 21st century.

History 
The Ministry's predecessor, the Ministry of International Trade and Industry, was in operation from 25 May 1949 to 5 January 2001. However, due to the reorganisation of central government ministries and agencies on 6 January 2001, the Ministry of Economy, Trade and Industry was established by reorganising and renaming the Ministry of International Trade and Industry. .

In the past, the Ministry of International Trade and Industry was regarded as the driving force behind high economic growth as the "Economic General Staff Headquarters", the general control centre of the Japanese economy or Japan Inc.

It made full use of the licences and administrative guidance that it possessed, and was mainly in charge of industrial policy, using allocated loans (FILP) from government-affiliated financial institutions, budget allowances, and subsidies as sources of power. In addition, it held a wide range of authority in areas such as science and technology research and development, trade, patents, energy policy, and small and medium enterprise policy according to technological innovation. It was also involved in monetary policy.

However, after Japan's period of high economic growth ended, one-off policy ideas were inevitably created because, despite having a wide range of authority, they were unable to administer licensing and subsidies compared to other ministries and agencies such as "operational government agencies." became the main one [7]. Ad balloons for various new policies are launched around May and June every year[7]. For this reason, while the Ministry of Finance is still a ``general government agency'' that is widely involved in decision-making through fiscal policy, budget assessments, and taxation, the Ministry of Economy, Trade and Industry is a ``administrative department store'' that has jurisdiction over most industries. Described as a “limited general government office”

Structure 
METI is organized into the following bureaus, offices, departments and 3 agencies (Agency for Natural Resources and Energy, Small and Medium Enterprise Agency, Japan Patent Office):
 Economic and Industrial Policy Bureau
 Economic and Industrial Policy Division
 Macro Economic Affairs Division
 Industrial Structure Policy Division
 Industrial Organization Division
 Industrial Revitalization Division
 Industrial Finance Division
 Corporate Affairs Division
 Research and Statistics Department
 Regional Economic and Industrial Policy Division
 Business Environment Promotion Division
 Industrial Facilities Division
 Regional Technology Division
 Trade Policy Bureau
 Multilateral Trade System Department
 Trade Policy Division
 Research and Analysis Division
 Economic Partnership Division
 Americas Division
 Europe, Middle East, and Africa Division
 Asia and Pacific Division
 Northeast Asia Division
 Trade and Economic Cooperation Bureau
 Trade Control Department
 Trade Control Policy Division
 Trade Licensing Division
 Security Export Control Policy Division
 Security Export Licensing Division
 Trade and Investment Facilitation Division
 Trade Financial and Economic Cooperation Division
 Financial Cooperation Division
 Technical Cooperation Division
 Trade Insurance Division
 Industrial Science and Technology Policy and Environment Bureau
 Industrial Science and Technology Policy Division
 Technology Evolution and Research Division
 Academia-Industry Cooperation Promotion Division
 Technology Promotion Division
 Research and Development Division
 Technical Regulations, Standards, and Conformity Assessment Policy Division
 Measurement and Intellectual Infrastructure Division
 Environmental Policy Division
 Recycling Promotion Division
 Manufacturing Industries Bureau
 Infrastructure and Advanced Systems Promotion Office
 Creative Industries Promotion Office ("Cool Japan Office")
 Water Industry and Infrastructure Systems Promotion Office
 Monodzukuri Policy Planning Office
 Office for Intellectual Property Right Infringement and International Trade
 Iron and Steel Division
 Iron and Steel Technology Office
 Nonferrous Metals Division
 Chemical Management Policy Division
 Chemical Safety Office
 Chemical Weapon and Drug Materials Control Policy Office
 Fluoride Gases Management Office
 Chemical Risk Assessment Office
 Chemicals Division
 Fine Chemicals Office
 Alcohol Office
 Bio-Industry Division
 Bio-Business Promotion Office
 Housing Industry, Ceramics and Construction Materials Division
 Fine Ceramics, Nanotechnologies and Advanced Materials Policy Planning Office
 Industrial Machinery Division
 Robot Industry Office
 International Projects Promotion Office
 Machine Parts and Tooling Industries Office
 Automobile Division
 Electric Vehicle and Advanced Technology Office
 ITS Promotion Office
 Automobile Recycling Policy Office
 Aerospace and Defense Industry Division
 Space Industry Office
 Vehicle Division
 Textile and Clothing Division
 Fashion Policy Office
 International Textile and Clothing Trade Office
 Paper Industry, Consumer and Recreational Goods Division
 Consumer Goods Office
 Traditional Craft Industry Office
 Design Policy Office
 Commerce and Information Policy Bureau
 Information Policy Division
 IT Project Office
 Information and International Policy Office
 Office for IT Security Policy
 Information and Communication Electronics Division
 Device Industry Strategy Office
 Environmental Affairs and Recycling Office
 Digital Consumer Electronics Strategy Office
 Information Service Industry Division
 Local Informatization and Human Resource Development Office
 Service Affairs Policy Division
 Service Industries Office
 Healthcare Industries Division
 Medical and Assistive Device Industries Office
 Creative Industries Division
 Fashion Policy Office
 Cool Japan Promotion Office
 Design Policy Office
 Consumer Goods Office
 Traditional Craft Industry Office
 Media and Content Industry Division
 Agency for Natural Resources and Energy
 Small and Medium Enterprise Agency
 Japan Patent Office
 Minister's Secretariat
 Regional Bureaus  & Industrial Safety and Inspection Department
 Incorporated Administrative Agencies

List of ministers

Controversial circumstance
In July 2019, when the diplomatic relations were distorted due to differences in the views of the South Korean government on the issue of recruitment workers and comfort women, restrictions were taken on the export of semiconductor components without any consultation with South Korea.

Footnotes

External links
 Ministry of Economy, Trade and Industry
 
  (in Japanese)

2001 establishments in Japan
Ministries established in 2001
Economy of Japan
Economy, Trade and Industry
Anti-dumping authorities
Trade policy of Japan
Japan
Japan
Japan
Industry in Japan